Potted Meat Spread is the debut album of Spongehead, released in 1988 by Shimmy Disc.

Track listing

Personnel 
Adapted from the Potted Meat Spread liner notes.

Spongehead
David Henderson – baritone saxophone, tenor saxophone, soprano saxophone, vocals
Doug Henderson – vocals, guitar, bass guitar
Mark Kirby – drums, vocals

Production and additional personnel
Kramer – production, engineering, backing vocals (A4)
Ruth Peyser – illustrations

Release history

References 

1988 debut albums
Albums produced by Kramer (musician)
Shimmy Disc albums
Spongehead albums